Debtor and Creditor can refer to:

 Debtor
 Creditor

See also

Debt